František Svoboda (24 January 1904 – 21 January 1991) was a Czechoslovak canoeist born in Prague who competed in the 1936 Summer Olympics.

Svoboda was born in Prague in January 1904. In 1936 he finished fifth in the folding K-1 10000 m event. He died in Prague on 21 January 1991, at the age of 86.

References

1904 births
1991 deaths
Czech male canoeists
Czechoslovak male canoeists
Olympic canoeists of Czechoslovakia
Canoeists at the 1936 Summer Olympics
Canoeists from Prague